Martha Reyes Alvarez is a Nicaraguan politician who currently serves as Minister of Health. She replaced Carolina Davila Murillo in 2020 at the start of the COVID-19 pandemic.

References 

Living people
Year of birth missing (living people)
Place of birth missing (living people)
21st-century Nicaraguan politicians
21st-century Nicaraguan women politicians
Health ministers of Nicaragua
Women government ministers of Nicaragua